The Albatros L 74 was a two-seated German training biplane, produced by Albatros Flugzeugwerke. Only two were produced.

Specifications

References
Michael J. H. Taylor. Jane's Encyclopedia of Aviation. Studio Editions, London (1989).

L 074
1920s German civil trainer aircraft